UTSA or Utsa may refer to:

 Uniform Trade Secrets Act, a uniform law on trade secret protection in the United States
 University of Texas at San Antonio, an American public research university
 UTSA Roadrunners, this university's athletic program
 Utsa Patnaik (fl. 1973–2010), an Indian Marxist economist
 Navoi International Airport in Uzbekistan, ICAO airport code UTSA

See also